Allway may refer to:

Allway (constituency), a constituency in Tsuen Wan District
Allway Gardens, a private housing estate in Tsuen Wan, Hong Kong
Allway Sync, a backup and file synchronization software